Dimitrov, or Ghuylasar Nerkin until 1949, is a village in the Artashat Municipality of the Ararat Province of Armenia.

It is renamed in 1949 in honor of Georgi Dimitrov − Comintern and Bulgarian Communist leader and prime minister of Bulgaria.

The village is inhabited mainly by Armenians and Assyrians.

References

External links 

World Gazetteer: Armenia – World-Gazetteer.com
Report of the results of the 2001 Armenian Census

Populated places in Ararat Province
Assyrian settlements
Assyrians in Armenia
Georgi Dimitrov